Spiterhøi is a mountain in Lom Municipality in Innlandet county, Norway. The mountain is surrounded by several other notable mountains including Skauthøi to the north; Glittertinden and Steinbukampen to the northeast; Veopallan to the east; Leirhøi, Veobretinden, and Veobreahesten to the southeast; Nørdre Hellstugutinden to the south; and Galdhøpiggen to the west.

See also
List of mountains of Norway by height

References

Jotunheimen
Lom, Norway
Mountains of Innlandet